Mike Strickland (born August 11, 1951) was a Canadian Football League running back for the BC Lions from 1975 through 1977, and for the Saskatchewan Roughriders in 1978 and 1979. He was an All-Star in 1976 and won the Eddie James Memorial Trophy that same season.

References

1951 births
Living people
American players of Canadian football
BC Lions players
Canadian football running backs
Eastern Michigan Eagles football players
Saskatchewan Roughriders players